The Voice Teens is a singing reality talent program for teenagers in Sri Lanka. It is a spin-off of John de Mol Jr.'s Dutch reality singing competition The Voice; unlike the adult original, this version is geared toward teenagers and is part of a larger international franchise.

The artists' performances are critiqued by a panel of four coaches, who then lead their teams of selected artists through the rest of the season. They also compete to guarantee that their act takes first place in the competition, earning them the winning coach. Dumal Warnakulasuriya, Raini Charuka, Ashanthi De Alwis, and Sanuka Wickremasinghe were on the first panel; Raini Charuka, Abhisheka Wimalaweera, Sanka Dineth and Lahiru Perera were on the second panel, which returned after a two-year break.

The show first aired on 8 February 2020 on Sirasa TV and ended its second season on July 03, 2022. It has produced two winners: Hashen Dulanjana and Panirsha Thiyagaraja.

This is the world's third The Voice Teens series (after Colombia and the Philippines) and Asia's second. The series' first season earned favorable reviews and was well-liked by the Sri Lankan people. The channel announced a second season, which premiered on January 29, 2022, and a major version (for people over 18), which began broadcasting in November 2020 and ended in December 2021, due to the show's enormous success.

Overview

Format 
The Voice Teens is a reality television show that is a spin-off of The Voice, which first broadcast in the Netherlands and was adapted in Colombia as La Voz Teens. Three coaches are used in the original Colombian system. Four coaches or judges look for a group of gifted individuals who could become Sri Lanka's next teenage singing sensation. The title of the show hints at the concept: the four coaches will judge a singer hopeful dubbed "Artist" solely on his or her vocal ability, regardless of physical appearance.

It is because of this notion that The Voice franchise stands out among other well-known reality talent shows that air on any known media channel, such as The X Factor, Got Talent, and even Idol. The lucky artists who made it through the audition phase would be divided into four teams, each of which would be coached by four well-known singers (dubbed "coaches" in the show) who would collaborate with them and choose songs for their artists to perform.

The blind auditions 
The blind auditions are the first stage, in which the four coaches, all well-known recording artists, listen to the contestants while sitting in seats facing away from the stage. If a coach loves what they hear from a contestant, they hit the "I Want You" button, which causes their chairs to rotate, indicating that they want to work with that contestant. If more than one coach hits their button, the contender choose the coach with whom he or she wishes to work. When each coach has a certain amount of contestants to work with, the blind auditions end. Coaches devote themselves to helping their vocalists grow psychologically, musically, and physically, as well as providing advise and sharing their secrets of success.

The battle rounds 
The contestants that pass the blind auditions advance to the battle rounds, when the coaches pit two of their own team members against one other in front of a studio audience to perform the same song together. After the verbal duel, the coach chooses just one person to continue to the knockout round, the next knockout phase. A key feature is that each coach was awarded one "steal," allowing them to choose one person who was eliminated by another coach during a battle round.

The knockout rounds 
Each of the surviving 28 artists compete with three/four other artists in the knockout round for a spot in the Live Shows phase. Only two of these performances will be chosen by the coach to advance to the top sixteen and the Live Shows phase.

On Season 2, the knockout rounds were slightly altered, with seven people performing and four chairs being assigned based on their performance thus far. As the chair placement progresses, three people will be eliminated and the remaining four will be selected for the super knockout rounds, where three will advance and one will be eliminated.

The live shows 
The top contenders from each team compete against each other in a live show during the competition's final performance phase. The television audience votes to retain one person from each team, leaving the coach to select who will move on and who will not on live television. The public decides between the two remaining artists on each team in the next round, while the coach has a vote that is weighted equally with the public vote.

Finally, each coach has one last competitor who will perform an original song in the finals. One of these four is dubbed "The Voice" and earns a cash award.

Development 
The Voice Teens will fill the age gap of the two earlier versions of The Voice franchise, wherein the age requirement was limited from ages 12 to 17. Auditions were announced in late 2019 and were held online.

Sri Lanka is known to be the third country in the world to adapt The Voice Teens franchise after its success in Colombia and the Philippines. It is also known that US Spanish, Malta, and Sri Lanka were the countries not to feature the regular edition as the first and main franchise which had Spanish Kid, Maltese Kid, and Teen versions respectively.

Coaches and hosts 
It was confirmed by Sirasa TV via the official Instagram and YouTube accounts that Raini Charuka, Sanuka Wickremasinghe, Ashanthi De Alwis and Dumal Warnakulasuriya will be the first season's coaches by posting several teasers including silouettes. For the 2nd season, it was confirmed that Raini would be returning with 3 new coaches, namely Sanka Dineth, Lahiru Perera and Abhisheka Wimalaweera. Throughout the 2 seasons, the show is hosted by Stephanie Siriwardhana.

Season summary 

 Artist's info

  Team Raini

  Team Sanuka

  Team Ashanthi

  Team Dumal

  Team Abhisheka 

  Team Lahiru

  Team Sanka

Teams 

 Contestant placing

Winners are in bold, finalists are in small italic font, and the eliminated artists are in small font.

References

External links 
 The Voice Teens Sri Lanka On YouTube
 The Voice Global on YouTube

Sri Lanka
Sri Lankan television shows
Television series about teenagers
Sirasa TV original programming